Sengamedu Srinivasa Badrinath (born 24 February 1940) is the Indian founder and chairman emeritus of Sankara Nethralaya, Chennai, one of India's largest charitable eye hospitals. He is an elected fellow of the National Academy of Medical Sciences. He received the Padma Bhushan, third-highest civilian award in the Republic of India in 1996. He also received many other awards, including Padma Shri and Dr. B. C. Roy Award.

Early life
Sengamedu Srinivasa Badrinath was born in Triplicane, a suburb of Chennai, India. His father, S. V. Srinivasa Rao, an engineer, was employed in the Madras Government Service. His mother, Lakshmi Devi, was the daughter of an advocate from Nerur, Tamil Nadu. He lost both his parents while still in his teens and completed his medical studies from the insurance money obtained following the demise of his father. Beginning his education late at age 7 due to a childhood illness, Badrinath studied at PS High School, Mylapore, and Sri Ramakrishna Mission High School, Chennai. He completed his collegiate studies at Loyola College between 1955 and 1957.

Medical career
Badrinath graduated from the Madras Medical College, Madras, in 1963. He did his internship and a year of internal medicine residency at the Glasslands Hospital, New York. Following the study of Basic Sciences in Ophthalmology at the New York University medical school, he did his residency in Ophthalmology at the Brooklyn Eye and Ear Infirmary, New York, and a fellowship with Charles Schepens at the Retina Service of the Massachusetts Eye and Ear Infirmary, Boston, Massachusetts. He became a Fellow of the Royal College of Surgeons of Canada in 1969 and Diplomate of the American Board of Ophthalmology in 1970. He returned to India in 1970 and from 1970, for a period of six years, he worked at the Voluntary Health Services, Chennai as a consultant. He set up a private practice in ophthalmology and vitreoretinal surgery at the H.M. Hospital (1970 to 1972) and Vijaya Hospital, Chennai (1973 to 1978). He has over 60 peer reviewed publications.

Awards and honors
 1996: Padma Bhushan
 1983: Padma Shri
1991: Dr. B. C. Roy National Award
1992: Paul Harris Fellow Award
 2009: V. Krishnamurthy Award for Excellence
2009: The Madras City Ophthalmological Association- Lifetime Achievement Award
2014: Lifetime Achievement Award- Vitreo Retinal Society, India

Sankara Nethralaya
In 1978, Badrinath, along with a group of philanthropists, founded the Medical & Vision Research Foundations in Madras in 1978. Sankara Nethralaya, a charitable not-for-profit eye hospital is a unit of the Medical Research Foundation.

On average, 1200 patients walk through the hospital doors and 100 surgeries are performed every day. Right from its inception in 1978, Sankara Nethralaya has been offering Fellowship programmes in Vitreo-Retinal Surgery, Cornea, Oculoplasty, Glaucoma, Uvea and General Ophthalmology to holders of Postgraduate Degree and Diploma in Ophthalmology. The institute also offers training programmes for graduates in Ophthalmology.

References

1940 births
Living people
Businesspeople from Chennai
Madras Medical College alumni
Indian ophthalmologists
Ramakrishna Mission schools alumni
Fellows of the National Academy of Medical Sciences
Recipients of the Padma Bhushan in medicine
Recipients of the Padma Shri in medicine
20th-century Indian medical doctors